Alborz may refer to:
Alborz, a mountain range in northern Iran
Alborz Province, a province of Iran
Alborz, Markazi, a village in Markazi Province, Iran
Alborz, Qom, a village in Qom Province, Iran
Alborz High School, a high school in Tehran
Alborz, a British-made Vosper Mark V class frigate